Direction may refer to:

Relative direction, for instance left, right, forward, backwards, up, and down
 Anatomical terms of location for those used in anatomy
 List of ship directions
Cardinal direction

Mathematics and science 
Direction vector, a unit vector that defines a direction in multidimensional space
Direction of a subspace of a Euclidean or affine space
 Directed set, in order theory
 Directed graph, in graph theory
 Directionality (molecular biology), the orientation of a nucleic acid

Music 
 For the guidance and cueing of a group of musicians during performance, see conducting
 Direction (album) a 2007 album by The Starting Line
 Direction (record label), a record label in the UK in the late 1960s, a subsidiary of CBS Records, specialising in soul music
 Directions: The Plans Video Album, a DVD video album made of videos inspired by songs from indie rock/pop band Death Cab for Cutie's album Plans
 Directions (Miles Davis album), 1981
 Directions (PC Quest album), 1992
 Directions (Norman Blake album), 1978
 "Direction", a song by the band Interpol, released as a B-side off the Six Feet Under soundtrack

Other uses 
Directions (film), a 2017 Bulgarian film
Film direction, the creative aspect of filmmaking
Stage direction, in theater
Writing direction, of writing systems
See Alexander technique for Direction, a concept in the Alexander Technique
 Directions (delegated legislation), a form of delegated legislation
Direction – Social Democracy, a major political party in Slovakia

See also
 Director (disambiguation)